Niphona appendiculatoides is a species of beetle in the family Cerambycidae. It was described by Stephan von Breuning in 1964. It is known from the Ivory Coast.

References

Endemic fauna of Ivory Coast
appendiculatoides
Beetles described in 1964